Hymenobacter seoulensis is a Gram-negative, aerobic, rod-shaped and non-motile bacterium from the genus of Hymenobacter which has been isolated from water from a river.

References

External links
Type strain of Hymenobacter seoulensis at BacDive -  the Bacterial Diversity Metadatabase

seoulensis
Bacteria described in 2017